A cottage is a small house.

Cottage may also refer to:

Places
Cottage, Mauritius, a village in Rivière du Rempart district, Mauritius
Cottage, Missouri, a community in the United States

Other uses
Cottage, slang for a public toilet, used as gay slang from the 1960s, see Cottaging
Cottage cheese, a kind of cheese curd
Cottage garden, profusely planted, random and carefree
Cottage industry, subcontractors working in their own facility, usually their home
Cottages (Van Gogh series), a subject of paintings by Vincent van Gogh
Craven Cottage, the football stadium of Fulham F.C. in London, England
Holiday cottage, a cottage or other small house used as vacation accommodation
University Cottage Club, one of the ten eating clubs at Princeton University

See also
 Cottager (disambiguation)
 The Cottage (disambiguation)